Princeton: A Search for Answers is a 1973 American short documentary film, directed by Julian Krainin and DeWitt Sage, and produced for the Princeton University Undergraduate Admissions Office as a recruiting film. In 1974, it won the Academy Award for Best Documentary (Short Subject) at the 46th Academy Awards.

See also
 List of American films of 1973

References

External links

, posted by Princeton University

1973 films
1973 short films
1973 documentary films
American short documentary films
American independent films
Best Documentary Short Subject Academy Award winners
Princeton University
1970s short documentary films
1973 independent films
1970s English-language films
1970s American films